The anime television series Bobobo-bo Bo-bobo is based on the manga series of the same name written and illustrated by Yoshio Sawai. The series was directed by Hiroki Shibata and produced by Toei Animation. It ran for 76 episodes from November 8, 2003 to October 29, 2005 on TV Asahi.

In North America, the anime was licensed by the Joy Tashjian Marketing Group, a licensing representative named by Toei Animation. The series first aired as a sneak peek on Cartoon Network's "Summer 2005 Kick-Off Special" in May 2005, and then premiered on 30 September and aired on Cartoon Network's Toonami programming block Saturdays at 10/9c, starting on 1 October. New episodes premiered on 17 February 2007. The series was seen on Cartoon Network's broadband service Toonami Jetstream from 5 November 2007, until its closure in January 2009. In the United Kingdom, the series premiered on Jetix on 16 April 2007.


Episode list

Home media release

English
The series was originally licensed for home video release in North America by Illumitoon Entertainment in 2006, who released only 2 volumes on bilingual DVD in 2007, before their distribution deal with Westlake Entertainment fell through, and all further volumes were canceled. S'more Entertainment later announced on 16 January 2012, that they would release the series with English subtitles and dubbing on DVD on 10 April of the same year. This release, however, lacked an English subtitle track, despite a fully translated script being present on a PDF file on disc 4 and indication on the box and pre-release information that there would be a subtitle track on the release. S'more Entertainment released a statement claiming the packaging was wrong, and there never was an intention to subtitle the release, due to costs. In August 2018, Discotek Media announced the licensee of the series and was released on 28 January 2020, as a SD Blu-ray Disc set with all the 76 episodes.

References

External links
 

Bobobo-bo Bo-bobo
Bobobo-bo Bo-bobo